Richard Griffin (born August 1, 1960), better known by his stage name Professor Griff, is an American rapper, spoken word artist, and lecturer currently residing in Atlanta. He was a member of the hip hop group Public Enemy, serving as the group's Minister  of Information.

During his time with Public Enemy, he was an adherent of the ideas espoused by Nation of Islam leader Louis Farrakhan, which informed both Griffin's and Public Enemy's ideological views. Having served in the U.S. Army and cultivating an interest in martial arts, he trained the S1W security team that toured with Public Enemy dressed in military uniforms, doing choreographed military step drills on stage.

Controversy and departure from Public Enemy
Before the release of It Takes a Nation of Millions to Hold Us Back, Professor Griff, in his role as Minister of Information, gave interviews to UK magazines on behalf of Public Enemy, during which he made homophobic and anti-Semitic remarks. In a 1988 issue of Melody Maker he stated, "There's no place for gays. When God destroyed Sodom and Gomorrah, it was for that sort of behaviour" and "If the Palestinians took up arms, went into Israel and killed all the Jews, it'd be all right." However, there was little controversy until May 22, 1989, when Griffin was interviewed by The Washington Times. At the time,  Public Enemy enjoyed unprecedented mainstream attention with the single "Fight the Power" from the soundtrack of Spike Lee's film Do the Right Thing.

During the interview with David Mills, Griffin made numerous statements such as "Jews are responsible for the majority of the wickedness in the world".  When the interview was published, a media firestorm emerged, and the band found itself under intense scrutiny.

In a series of press conferences, Griffin was either fired, quit, or never left. Def Jam co-founder Rick Rubin had already left the label by then; taking his place alongside Russell Simmons was Lyor Cohen, the son of Israeli immigrants who had run Rush Artist Management since 1985. Before the dust settled, Cohen claims to have arranged for a Holocaust Museum to give the band a private tour.

In an attempt to defuse the situation, Public Enemy frontman Chuck D first expressed an apology on Griffin's behalf, and fired Griffin soon thereafter. Griffin later rejoined the group, provoking more protests, causing Chuck D to briefly disband the group. When Public Enemy reformed, due to increasing attention from the press and pressure from Def Jam hierarchy, Griffin was no longer with the band.

Griffin later publicly expressed remorse for his statements after a meeting with the National Holocaust Awareness Student Organization in 1990.

In his 2009 book Analytixz, Griffin once again admitted the faults in his 1989 statement: "To say the Jews are responsible for the majority of wickedness that went on around the globe, I would have to know about the majority of wickedness that went on around the globe, which is impossible...I'm not the best knower—God is. Then, not only knowing that, I would have to know who is at the crux of all of the problems in the world and then blame Jewish people, which is not correct." Griff also said that not only were his words taken out of context, but that the recording was never released to the public for an unbiased listen. In a YouTube interview on August 2, 2018, Griffin recalled one of his many long conversations with record executive Lyor Cohen he said he used to have respectful debates about history: "I told him about the history of him and his people about the Ashkenazi, the Ashke-Nazis, and when I laid it on him he couldn't handle it and I'm like, all right, which is common knowledge today everybody talking about it, you understand what I'm saying people are making books about it."

Afrocentrism

Griffin embraces a form of Afrocentrism. He is a member of the Nation of Islam.

After his departure from Public Enemy, Griffin formed his own group, the Last Asiatic Disciples. Griffin's albums were of an Islamic and Afrocentric style, combined with increasingly spoken word lyrics.

His lyrics and record titles as a solo artist referenced his allegiance to the Nation of Islam. Another general theme in his lyrics is New World Order conspiracy.

Personal life
On August 27, 2017, Griffin married rapper Solé. The couple met 23 years earlier and resumed their relationship after Solé and Ginuwine divorced.

Discography

References

External links

African American–Jewish relations
African-American male rappers
Afrocentrists
Members of the Nation of Islam
Living people
Atlantic Records artists
Five percenters
People from Roosevelt, New York
Public Enemy (band) members
Rappers from New York (state)
1960 births
21st-century American rappers